The Seth French House (also known as the Fairview Cottage) is a historic house located at 319 East French Avenue in Orange City, Florida. It is locally significant as one of the oldest dwellings in the county, and also as a good example of Frame Vernacular construction from the late 19th and early 20th centuries. The house was built for American Civil War veteran and surgeon Seth French in 1876. He served in the Florida Senate in 1879.

Description and history 
The house, as built originally, consisted of the rectangular main block. On the first floor it included the wraparound veranda on the main (south) and east elevations, parlor, living room, dining room, kitchen, storage area, and small wrap-around porch on the northwest corner. On the second floor it included the three bedrooms, stair hall, and vestibule. 

The house was built in 1876 by Seth French, a surgeon and Civil War veteran and later a member of the Florida Senate and the state's Commissioner of Immigration. The house was altered 3 times – in 1905, 1915 and 1925 – and is now owned by French's great-granddaughter.

On February 12, 2003, it was added to the U.S. National Register of Historic Places.

References

External links

 Volusia County listings at National Register of Historic Places
 Great Floridians of Orange City at Florida's Office of Cultural and Historical Programs

Houses on the National Register of Historic Places in Volusia County, Florida
Orange City, Florida
Houses completed in 1876
1876 establishments in Florida